Cheeke is a surname. Notable people with the surname include:

 Alfred Cheeke (1810–1876), judge of the Supreme Court of New South Wales
 Robert Cheeke (born 1980), American bodybuilder, motivational speaker, and author
 Stephen Cheeke (born 1967), British author and senior lecturer